The Battle of Quiévrain refers to two events of conflict between the Archduchy of Austria and the Kingdom of France in late April 1792 during the War of the First Coalition.

On 28 April, there was a minor skirmish at Quiévrain, just across the Franco-Belgian border, resulting in a victory for the French army under the command of general Armand-Louis de Gontaut Biron. However, although Biron advanced and planned to take the city of Mons and eventually Brussels, he judged his forces were not strong enough and decided to retreat. On 30 April, as his troops were passing by Quiévrain again, a false alarm of an Austrian attack caused the soldiers to panic, and they fled back to Valenciennes in a disorderly fashion. His ally Théobald Dillon, who served with Biron under marshal Rochambeau during this invasion, suffered an even worse fate during the battle of Marquain (29 April), some 35 kilometres to the northeast.

References 

Quiévrain
Conflicts in 1792
1792 in France
1792 in the Holy Roman Empire
1792 in the Habsburg monarchy 
Battle